Cherry Pie is the second studio album by American glam metal band Warrant, released September 11, 1990. The album is the band's best-known and highest-selling release and peaked at number 7 on the Billboard 200. The album featured the top 40 hits "Cherry Pie" and "I Saw Red".

Production and marketing 
Cherry Pie was released on September 11, 1990 through Columbia Records. Like its predecessor, Dirty Rotten Filthy Stinking Rich, it was recorded at The Enterprise in Burbank, California.

It is rumored that Erik Turner and Joey Allen did not play on the album and that all guitar work had been performed by ex-Streets guitarist and session musician Mike Slamer. The rumor has never been verified, although Slamer's wife confirmed in 1998 that her husband played guitar on the record. The album's liner notes refer to Turner's function as "G-string" and Allen's as "Bong Riffs", adding that "Erik & Joey would like to thank Mike Slamer & Tommy Girvin for their Wielding G string Inspirations". Producer Beau Hill stated in a 2012 interview that Slamer did in fact play on the album. Beau had said to the band that the "songs are really great, but I think we’re a little weak in the solo department and so I like to bring somebody in". Beau also stated that "everybody in the band signed off on it and everything was done above ground".

Slamer was joined by numerous other guest performers; the record also features contributions from Jani Lane's brother Erik Oswald, guitarist C. C. DeVille from Poison, guitarist and bassist Bruno Ravel and drummer Steve West from Danger Danger, and singer Fiona.

The album carried a parental advisory sticker in the United States, due to the final track, "Ode to Tipper Gore", which consisted of a collection of swear words cut from the band's live performances. A "clean" version of the album also existed, with the final track removed, and an audible "bleep" of a curse in a previous song, "Train, Train," which featured the line "All a-fucking-board" at the beginning of the uncensored version.

Canadian cable-TV music network MuchMusic refused to air the "Cherry Pie" video on the grounds that it was "offensively sexist".

Songs 

The album's lead single, "Cherry Pie", was dedicated to the president of Sony Music Entertainment US Don Ienner. The dedication was no doubt inspired by the record company pressure which led to the track's creation. The record was completed without the song, but Warrant's label requested that a new rock "anthem" be added in order to enhance its marketability. Vocalist Lane responded by writing "Cherry Pie" in 15 minutes. Bassist Jerry Dixon and guitarist Allen, who believed the album was complete and were playing in a charity golf tournament in Denver, were called back to Los Angeles to complete the track. The single comprises a string of metaphorical references to sex and bears some melodic resemblance to Def Leppard's "Pour Some Sugar on Me", and The Arrows' "I Love Rock 'n' Roll". The guitar solo was performed by Poison's guitarist C. C. DeVille. At the end of the solo, a vocal aside acknowledges "trained professional".

"Cherry Pie" became a Top Ten hit on the Billboard Hot 100, reaching number 10 and also reached number 19 on the Mainstream Rock Tracks. The song has been cited by many as a "rock anthem".  In 2009, it was named the 56th best hard rock song of all time by VH1.

The video for "Cherry Pie" received heavy airplay on MTV and other music video stations. It featured the members of Warrant and a scantily clad woman (model Bobbie Brown) who is seen dancing throughout the video while the band members perform and make tongue-in-cheek references to the song's lyrics (for example, when the above-quoted line referencing baseball is sung, Brown appears in a form-fitting baseball uniform, complete with a bat), all against a white background.

Brown became involved with Lane soon after the video was shot, and married him in 1991.

The record's second single was "I Saw Red", a power ballad inspired by a true story of betrayal. It was written after Lane had walked in on his girlfriend in bed with his best friend, resulting in his nervous breakdown and the delayed release of the band's first record Dirty Rotten Filthy Stinking Rich. The song was one of Warrant's most successful singles, reaching number 10 on the Billboard Hot 100, number 14 on the Mainstream Rock Tracks chart and #36 on the Australian charts and spawning two music videos.

Prior to the writing of the song "Cherry Pie", the album's title and first single was to have been "Uncle Tom's Cabin", a track which foreshadowed the kind of imaginative songwriting which would later be more fully revealed on the Dog Eat Dog record. Although named after the classic novel by Harriet Beecher Stowe, the song tells the story of a witness to the involvement of local police in a double murder and appeared to have nothing to do with slavery, racism, or the Deep South (although the video for the song was set in Louisiana). It was eventually released as the third single (removing the solo acoustic guitar intro) and charted at number 78 on the Billboard Hot 100 and number 19 on the Mainstream Rock Tracks chart.

"Blind Faith" was released as the fourth single from album. The song charted at number 88 on the Billboard Hot 100 and number 39 on the Mainstream Rock Tracks chart and also featured a music video.

Track listing

Personnel 
Warrant
 Jani Lane – vocals, acoustic guitar, arranger
 Joey Allen – rhythm guitar, banjo
 Erik Turner – rhythm guitar, arrangement
 Jerry Dixon – bass guitar
 Steven Sweet – drums

Additional personnel
 C. C. DeVille – guitar solo on track 1
 Mike Slamer – guitar solos on all songs except on track 1
 Eric Oswald (Jani Lane's brother) – acoustic intro on Uncle Tom's Cabin
 Scott Warren – keyboards
 Bruno Ravel – backing vocals
 Steve West – backing vocals
 Fiona – backing vocals
 Alan Hewitt – organ, piano, strings
 Beau Hill – organ, banjo, arrangement, keyboards, production, mixing
 Paul Harris – piano, strings
 Juke Logan – harmonica

Production
 Jimmy Hoyson – engineering, mixing
 Martin Horenburg – assistant engineer
 Dave Collins – digital editing, sequencing
 Hugh Syme – art direction, design
Dale Lavi – photography
 Danny Stag – arrangements
 Johnny B. Frank – arrangements
 Ted Jensen – mastering

Charts 

Album

Singles

Certifications

Video album
Cherry Pie: Quality You Can Taste is the second video album from Warrant released in 1991. The video features backstage interviews, concert clips including a preview of the band's next album and the music videos from Cherry Pie.

 "Cherry Pie"
 "I Saw Red"
 "Blind Faith"
 "Uncle Tom's Cabin"
 "I Saw Red" (acoustic version)

References 

Warrant (American band) albums
1990 albums
Albums produced by Beau Hill
Columbia Records albums